The SwissEver GP Cham-Hagendorn is a women's one-day road bicycle race held in Switzerland. Between 2015 and 2019, it was rated by the Union Cycliste Internationale (UCI) as a 1.2 race. In 2005 and 2012, the race was held as the Swiss National Road Race Championships.

Past winners

References

External links 
 

Cycle races in Switzerland
Women's road bicycle races